Ed Lange may refer to:

 Ed Lange (American football) (1887–?), American football player
 Ed Lange (photographer) (1920–1995), nudist photographer and publisher
 Edward Lange (1926–1976), American basketball player